The Blacklips Performance Cult was an avant-garde drag performance group based in New York City's Lower East Side, at the Pyramid Club. The collective was active from summer 1992 to spring 1995.

Blacklips was founded in the summer of 1992 by ANOHNI with Johanna Constantine and Psychotic Eve. In a short time, the group had grown to consist of 13 to 20 downtown artists and performers.

Blacklips performance Cult started doing shows in the Crow Bar but soon moved to the Pyramid Club, where it would set up different plays each Monday night. The first play was The Scarlet Letter by ANOHNI, shown for the first and last time 12 October 1992. The last play was 13 WAYS TO DIE, which was shown for the first and last time 13 March 1995. ANOHNI directed two plays "The Birth of Anne Frank" and "Miracle Now" which were performed with many of the Blacklips members at PS122.

The troupe quickly became famous in the underground club culture of the Lower East Side - especially known for its trademark: "Bloodbags and Beauty". In one of the plays, called Starvation, the dancers dressed as maggots and threw liver into the audience during a "maggot ballet".

It was in the Blacklips Performance Cult that ANOHNI first gained attention for her extraordinary voice. During performances she sang songs including Rapture, Blue Angel and Hitler in My Heart for the first time. These songs were later published on her first album as part of Antony and the Johnsons

List of troupemembers 
ANOHNI (sometimes credited as Fiona Blue)
Johanna Constantine
Psychotic Eve
Hattie Hathaway
James F. Murphy
Sissy Fit
Lily of the Valley (Michael Cavadias)
Kabuki Starshine
Page
Flloyd
Lost Forever
Lulu
Pearls
Mouse
Howie Pyro
Clark Render
Ebony Jet
Herr Klunch
Holly Fur

External links 
 Blacklips archive
Performing groups established in 1992
1992 establishments in New York City
Arts organizations disestablished in 1995
1995 disestablishments in New York (state)

Defunct Theatre companies in New York City